Zhangye Ganzhou Airport , or Zhangye Southeast Air Base, is a dual-use military and civil airport serving the city of Zhangye in Gansu Province, China. Construction began in May 2010 to convert the air base to a dual-use airport, at an estimated cost of 313 million yuan. The airport was opened on 1 November 2011.

Facilities
The airport has one  runway (class 4C), and a 4,126 square-meter terminal building.  It is designed to handle 243,000 passengers and 1,700 tons of cargo annually by 2020.

Airlines and destinations

See also
List of airports in China
List of the busiest airports in China
List of People's Liberation Army Air Force airbases

References

Airports in Gansu
Chinese Air Force bases
Buildings and structures in Zhangye
2011 establishments in China
Airports established in 2011